In astrology, bestial signs are those astrological signs that represent animals.  They are sometimes referred to as quadrupedian, or four-footed signs because they represent animals that walk on all four legs.  These animals are inarticulate, which means they have voices, but their power of speech is not developed.  Individuals who are strongly influenced by the bestial signs quite often have speech impediments and a larger than usual amount of body hair.

The bestial signs in the zodiac are Aries, Taurus, Leo and Capricorn.  Because they are not able to express themselves in the manner that they would like, they often become frustrated at their inability to fully communicate.  Individuals strongly affected by these signs quite often have difficulty reading and writing as well as speaking, and therefore need extra tuition to help them to overcome those hurdles.

Western astrological signs